Raincloud can refer to:

 Nimbus cloud
 "Raincloud" (song), by the Lighthouse Family

See also
 "Little Black Rain Cloud", a song from the 1966 animated film Winnie the Pooh and the Honey Tree
 The Raincloud Man, an audio drama based on the British science fiction television series Doctor Who